The Temple School (1834 – ca.1841), in Boston, Massachusetts, USA, was established by Amos Bronson Alcott and Elizabeth Palmer Peabody in 1834, and featured a teaching style based on conversation. Teachers working at the school included Elizabeth Peabody and Margaret Fuller.

History
Alcott was fundamentally and philosophically opposed to corporal punishment as a means of disciplining his students; instead, he offered his own hand for an offending student to strike, saying that any failing was the teacher's responsibility. The shame and guilt this method induced, he believed, was far superior to the fear instilled by corporal punishment; when he used physical "correction" he required that the students be unanimously in support of its application, even including the student to be punished.

As assistants in the Temple School, Alcott had two young women who have subsequently come to be considered among nineteenth-century America's most talented writers, 30-year-old Elizabeth Palmer Peabody who, in 1835, published A Record of Mr. Alcott's School and 26-year-old Margaret Fuller who was a teacher during 1836–1837; as students he had children of the Boston intellectual classes, including future writer Josiah Phillips Quincy, grandson of Harvard University president, Josiah Quincy III. Alcott's methods were not well received; many readers found his conversations on the Gospels close to blasphemous, a few brief but frank discussions with the children regarding birth and circumcision were considered obscene and a number of his ideas were denigrated as ridiculous. The influential conservative Unitarian Andrews Norton, a vocal opponent of Transcendentalism, derided the book as one-third blasphemy, one-third obscenity, and the rest nonsense. The school was widely denounced in the press, with only a few scattered supporters, and Alcott was rejected by most public opinion. The controversy caused many parents to remove their children.

Image gallery

References

Further reading

 Elizabeth Palmer Peabody. Record of a School: Exemplifying the General Principles of Spiritual Culture, 2nd ed. Russell, Shattuck & Company, 1836.
 Amos Bronson Alcott. Conversations with Children on the Gospels. Boston: J. Munroe, 1837. vol.2

Schools in Boston
Former buildings and structures in Boston
1834 establishments in Massachusetts
History of Boston
19th century in Boston
1830s in the United States